Lisanne may refer to:

 Lisanne Bainbridge, author of the 1983 research paper Ironies of Automation
 Lisanne Falk (born 1964), American actress and film producer
 Lisanne Froon (19912014), one of two Dutch students who died while hiking in Panama
 Lisanne de Lange (born 1994), field hockey player from the Netherlands
 Lisanne Lejeune (born 1963), former Dutch field hockey defender
 Lisanne Norman (born 1951), science fiction author
 Lisanne de Roever (born 1979), Dutch field hockey player
 Lisanne Soemanta (born 1987), Dutch professional racing cyclist
 Lisanne de Witte (born 1992), Dutch sprinter

Other 

 Lisanne Gardner, a character from the American daytime soap opera Days of Our Lives

See also 

 Lišane Ostrovičke, a village and a municipality in Croatia in the Zadar County

de:Lisanne